Assassins is a 2020 American documentary film, directed and produced by Ryan White. It talks about the assassination of Kim Jong-nam and the two assassins who were tricked.

The film had its world premiere at the Sundance Film Festival on January 26, 2020. It was released on December 11, 2020 by Greenwich Entertainment.

Synopsis
The film follows the assassination of Kim Jong-nam, as he is assassinated by two young women who were tricked and thought they were participating in a prank show.

Release
The film had its world premiere at the Sundance Film Festival on January 26, 2020. Shortly after, Magnolia Pictures acquired distribution rights to the film. Due to the subject matter, the film struggled to find distribution, with Magnolia opting to release the film internationally instead, and Hulu acquiring rights to the film before dropping it. In September 2020, Greenwich Entertainment acquired U.S. distribution rights to the film. It was released on December 11, 2020. In June 2021, Assassins was granted art movie status following an initial rejection by the Korean Film Council (KOFIC) in May 2021.

Reception

Critical reception
Assassins received positive reviews from film critics. The site's critical consensus reads, "A deft and illuminating journalistic investigation, Assassins depicts the mechanics of North Korean politics to a chilling effect." On Metacritic, the film holds a rating of 74 out of 100, based on 13 critics, indicating "generally favorable reviews."

References

External links
 
 
 

2020 films
2020 documentary films
American documentary films
Films scored by Blake Neely
Documentary films about nuclear war and weapons
Documentary films about law
Documentary films about organized crime
Documentary films about North Korea
Documentary films about death
2020s American films